James Samuel McIlroy  (born 30 December 1976) is a British middle-distance runner. He initially represented Ireland before changing his nationality. When he was 21 years old he showed great promise by finishing fourth over 800 metres in the 1998 European Athletics Championship having taken 14 seconds off his personal best in only 13 months.  Serving a 1-year ban for changing nationality McIlroy still produced the 3rd fastest British All - time 1000 metres behind Sebastian Coe and Steve Cram when finishing 4th in Rieti, (Italy). In 2000 he won his first of five British Championships and representing Great Britain made the Sydney Olympics semi - final . Representing Northern Ireland McIlroy managed 6th at the 2002 Manchester Commonwealth Final after getting badly boxed in.  From 2002 onwards McIlroy spent considerable time in South Africa training and after being injured for most of the 2003 - 4 season he again finished 4th at the European Indoor Championships in Valencia in 2005.

On 19 March 2008 McIlroy, who had been Britain's top middle-distance runner for  a decade, announced his immediate retirement from athletics.

He had competed for Great Britain & Northern Ireland earlier in the month at the World Indoor Athletics Championships in Valencia but failed to finish his opening round heat of the 1500 metres, due to pulled intercostal muscles.  Apart from the blip in Spain, McIlroy has had a very successful indoor campaign winning the Irish 800 metres and UK 1500 metres titles.

McIlroy, a member of  Windsor, Slough & Eton  had moved up to the latter distance after concentrating on 800 metres since bursting on the scene with a fourth place at the European Championships in 1998.

He is the fastest ever Irishman, north or south, at 600, 800, and 1000 metres with times of 76.52 seconds clocked in Potchefstroom, South Africa in 2005, 1 minute 44.65 seconds clocking from Rieti, Italy in 2005, and 2.15.57 seconds again in Rieti, Italy.  He won 5 British titles and came Runner up  3 times.

McIlroy came out of retirement in 2010 whilst completing his MBA to compete at the New Delhi Commonwealth Games making the semi - finals of both the 800 metres and 1500 metres.

McIlroy was awarded the British Empire Medal (BEM) in the 2022 New Year Honours for services to athletics in Northern Ireland.

References

 

1976 births
Living people
Male middle-distance runners from Northern Ireland
Olympic athletes of Great Britain
Athletes (track and field) at the 2000 Summer Olympics
Commonwealth Games competitors for Northern Ireland
Athletes (track and field) at the 2002 Commonwealth Games
Athletes (track and field) at the 2006 Commonwealth Games
Athletes (track and field) at the 2010 Commonwealth Games
People educated at Larne Grammar School
Irish male middle-distance runners
Recipients of the British Empire Medal